{{Infobox election
| election_name     = 2004 United States Senate election in Oklahoma
| country           = Oklahoma
| flag_year         = 1988
| type              = presidential
| ongoing           = no
| previous_election = 1998 United States Senate election in Oklahoma
| previous_year     = 1998
| next_election     = 2010 United States Senate election in Oklahoma
| next_year         = 2010
| election_date     = November 2, 2004
| image_size        = 125x136px

| image1            = Tom Coburn official portrait 112th Congress.jpg
| nominee1          = Tom Coburn
| party1            = Republican Party (United States)
| popular_vote1     = 763,433
| percentage1       = 52.8%

| image2            = BradCarson OfficialPortrait.jpg
| nominee2          = Brad Carson
| party2            = Democratic Party (United States)
| popular_vote2     = 596,750
| percentage2       = 41.2%

| image3            = 
| nominee3          = Sheila Bilyeu
| party3            = Independent (United States)
| popular_vote3     = 86,663
| percentage3       = 6.0%

| map_image         = 2004 United States Senate election in Oklahoma results map by county.svg
| map_size          = 
| map_caption       = County resultsCoburn:    Carson:  
| title             = U.S. Senator
| before_election   = Don Nickles
| before_party      = Republican Party (United States)
| after_election    = Tom Coburn
| after_party       = Republican Party (United States)
}}

The 2004 United States Senate election in Oklahoma''' took place on November 2, 2004. The election was concurrent with elections to the United States House of Representatives and the presidential election. Incumbent Republican U.S. Senator Don Nickles decided to retire instead of seeking a fifth term. Republican nominee Tom Coburn won the open seat.

Democratic primary

Candidates 
 Brad Carson, U.S. Representative
 Carroll Fisher, Oklahoma Insurance Commissioner
 Jim Rogers, perennial candidate
 Monte E. Johnson, attorney
 W. B. G. Woodson

Polling

Results

Republican primary

Candidates 
 Tom Coburn, former U.S. Representative
 Kirk Humphreys, former Mayor of Oklahoma City
 Bob Anthony, Oklahoma Corporation Commissioner
 Jay Richard Hunt, activist

Campaign 
Humphreys, the former Mayor of Oklahoma City, ran for the United States Senate with institutional conservative support, namely from Senators Don Nickles and Jim Inhofe, as well as former Congressman J. C. Watts. However, Coburn received support from the Club for Growth and conservative activists within Oklahoma. Humphreys noted, "[Coburn  is] kind of a cult hero in the conservative portion of our party, not just in Oklahoma. You can't get right of the guy." Much of Coburn's celebrity within the Republican Party came from his tenure in Congress, where he battled House Speaker Newt Gingrich, who he argued was moving the party to the center of the political spectrum due to their excessive federal spending. Coburn's maverick nature culminated itself in 2000 when he backed conservative activist Alan Keyes for President rather than George W. Bush or John McCain.

Ultimately, Coburn triumphed over Humphreys, Anthony, and Hunt in the primary, winning every county in Oklahoma except for tiny Harmon County.

Polling

Results

General election

Candidates 
 Sheila Bilyeu (I), perennial candidate
 Brad Carson (D), United States Congressman from Oklahoma's 2nd congressional district
 Tom Coburn (R), former United States Congressman from Oklahoma's 2nd congressional district

Campaign 
Carson and Coburn engaged each other head-on in one of the year's most brutal Senate contests. Coburn and the National Republican Senatorial Committee attacked Carson for being too liberal for Oklahoma and for being a vote in lockstep with John Kerry, Hillary Clinton, and Ted Kennedy. To drive the point home, one television advertisement aired by the Coburn campaign accused Carson of being "dangerously liberal" and not supporting the War on Terrorism. Coburn was aided in this effort by the fact that the Kerry campaign did not contest the state of Oklahoma and that incumbent President George W. Bush was expected to win Oklahoma comfortably. This was compounded by the fact that Vice-President Dick Cheney campaigned for Coburn and appeared in several television advertisements for him. Carson countered by emphasizing his Stilwell roots and his moderation, specifically, bringing attention to the fact that he fought for greater governmental oversight of nursing home care for the elderly. Carson responded to the attacks against him by countering that his opponent had committed Medicaid fraud years prior, in an event that reportedly left a woman sterilized without her consent. Ultimately, however, Carson was not able to overcome Oklahoma's conservative nature and Senator Kerry's abysmal performance in Oklahoma, and he was defeated by Coburn by 11.5%. As of 2022, the result remains the closest the Democrats have come to winning a Senate election in Oklahoma since David Boren won a landslide reelection victory in 1990.

Predictions

Polling

Results

See also 
 2004 United States Senate elections

Notes

References 

United States Senate
Oklahoma
2004